"Pleasure and Pain" is a song written by Michael Chapman and Holly Knight, produced by Chapman for Divinyls' second studio album What a Life! (1985). It was released as the album's fourth single in the formats of 7-inch single and 12" single. It became one of their most successful songs, charting at No. 11 in Australia, No. 8 in New Zealand and No. 76 in the United States.

Reception
Junkee said, "Literally any Divinyls song ever recorded could have been called "Pleasure & Pain". Chrissy Amphlett’s titanic voice was all about pushing prettiness until it became punishing. "Pleasure & Pain" is a leather boot, pinned directly into your chest."

In January 2018, as part of Triple M's "Ozzest 100", the 'most Australian' songs of all time, "Pleasure and Pain" was ranked number 43.

Formats and track listing
Australian 7-inch single
 "Pleasure and Pain"
 "What a Life!"

Australian 12" single
 "Pleasure and Pain" (extended mix)
 "Pleasure and Pain" (instrumental extended mix)
 "What a Life!"

US 7-inch single
 "Pleasure and Pain"
 "Heart Telegraph"

US 12" single
 "Pleasure and Pain" – 5:58
 "Pleasure and Pain" (instrumental) – 6:25

Charts

Weekly charts

Year-end charts

In other media
In 2016, the song appeared in the season 4 premiere of the prison television series, Wentworth.

References

1985 singles
1986 singles
Divinyls songs
Songs written by Holly Knight
Songs written by Mike Chapman
Song recordings produced by Mike Chapman
1985 songs
Chrysalis Records singles